True to Self is the second studio album by American singer Bryson Tiller. It was released on May 26, 2017, by RCA Records. Recording sessions took place from 2016 to 2017, while the production was handled by several producers from Teddy Walton, J-Louis, NES, Boi-1da, Frank Dukes, Illmind, Hollywood Hot Sauce, Keyz, Soundz, T-Minus and Wondagurl, among others.

The album was supported by the two singles: "Somethin Tells Me" and "Run Me Dry". In August 2017, Tiller started the Set It Off tour to promote the album. True to Self debuted at number one on the Billboard 200, selling 107,000 album-equivalent units and 47,000 copies in the first week.

Background and release
On January 17, 2017, Tiller announced that he was working on his second album, titled True to Self. While talking about the recording of the album in an interview with Rolling Stone, Tiller said; "I posted something on Instagram like, "album almost done", then I met this producer named Nes, and the way he produces his beats just changed everything. So I started my whole album over."

On May 11, 2017, he revealed the album's artwork, announcing that it would be released on June 23; also he later released three new songs, titled "Honey", "Somethin Tells Me" and "Get Mine"; the latter features American rapper Young Thug. On May 23, Tiller posted the complete tracklist on his Instagram account. On May 26, he released True to Self a month early before the intended release. In an interview with Billboard, Tiller explained the motivation behind the album's early release; "I can't take the credit for that. It was just my manager; it was his plan [to] drop it a month early. I've been ready to get the music to the fans as soon as possible, so why not?" In a 2020 interview with Billboard, he stated that he did not put energy or time into the album because he did not want to make or release the album due to legal and personal matters.

Promotion
The album's lead single, "Somethin Tells Me", was released on May 11, 2017. The music video for the song premiered on Tiller's Vevo channel on May 25, 2017. The song has peaked at number 74 on the US Billboard Hot 100. "Run Me Dry" was sent to the rhythmic contemporary radio as the album's second single on July 25, 2017. The single's music video premiered on September 12, 2017. It has peaked at number 91 on the Billboard Hot 100. Tiller also released a music video for the song "Self-Made".

In May 2017, Tiller announced the dates for the Set It Off tour in North America across the United States and Canada, which started on August 3, 2017. In North America he was joined by R&B singer H.E.R. and record producer Metro Boomin. The second leg of the tour was announced in July 2017 taking place across Europe, which started on October 17, 2017. In Europe he was joined by R&B singer SZA. In September 2017, Tiller announced the third leg of the tour in New Zealand and Australia, which started on September 22.

Critical reception

True to Self received generally favorable reviews from music critics. At Metacritic, which assigns a normalized rating out of 100 to reviews from mainstream publications, the album received an average score of 63, based on six reviews.

Commercial performance
True to Self debuted at number one on the US Billboard 200, earning 107,000 album-equivalent units (including 47,000 copies as pure album sales) in its first week. This became Tiller's first US number one debut on the chart. In its second week, the album dropped to number 13 on the chart, earning an additional 29,000 units. In its third week, the album dropped to number 22 on the chart, earning 20,000 more units. On August 3, 2018, the album was certified gold by the Recording Industry Association of America (RIAA) for combined sales and album-equivalent units of over 500,000 units in the United States.

Track listing
Credits were adapted from Tidal.

Notes
  signifies a co-producer
  signifies an additional producer
Sample credits
 "Rain on Me (Intro)" contains a sample of SWV's "Rain", and Drake's Brand New.
 "No Longer Friends" contains a sample of Tweet's "My Place".
 "We Both Know" contains a sample of Changing Faces' "Stroke You Up".
 "In Check" contains a sample of Brandy, Tamia, Gladys Knight, and Chaka Khan's "Missing You".
 "Self-Made" contains a sample of Stavros Xarchakos' "Palikari Dipsasmeno".
 "High Stakes" contains a sample of The Spinners' "(Do It Do It) No One Does It Better".
 "Teach Me a Lesson" contains a sample of Marsha Ambrosius' "Your Hands".
 "Stay Blessed" contains a sample of Mary J. Blige's "Don’t Go".
 "Set It Off" contains a sample of Faith Evans' "You Are My Joy (Interlude)".
 "Before You Judge" contains excerpts of Ice Cube's "Check Yo Self (Remix)".
 "Always (Outro)" contains a sample of Changing Faces' "Foolin’ Around".

Personnel
Credits adapted from Tidal.

Performers
 Bryson Tiller – primary artist

Technical
 Michael "Black Mic" Williams – audio engineer 
 Fabian Marasciullo – mixing engineer 
 McCoy Socalgargoyle – assistant mixing engineer 
 Colin Leonard – mastering engineer 	
 Matthew Samuels – recording engineer 
 Ramon Ibanga – recording engineer 
 Tyler Williams – recording engineer 

Instruments
 Wow Jones – keyboard 
 Fingazz – talkbox 

Production
 NES – producer 
 Teddy Walton – producer 
 Swiff D – producer 
 Gravez – producer 
 WondaGurl – producer 
 FrancisGotHeat – producer 
 Hollywood Hot Sauce – producer 
 J-Louis – producer 
 Rob Holladay – additional producer 
 Skyz Muzik– producer 
 Wow Jones – additional producer , producer 
 Boi-1da – producer 
 Allen Ritter – co-producer 
 Ayo – producer 
 Xeryus – producer 
 Keyz – co-producer 
 Mahxie – producer 
 Pro Logic – producer 
 Illmind – producer 
 IAMNOBODI – producer 
 Soundz – producer 
 T-Minus – producer 
 Frank Dukes – producer

Charts

Weekly charts

Year-end charts

Certifications

References

External links
Official website

2017 albums
Bryson Tiller albums
RCA Records albums
Albums produced by Boi-1da
Albums produced by Frank Dukes
Albums produced by Illmind
Albums produced by T-Minus (record producer)
Albums produced by WondaGurl
Albums produced by Allen Ritter